Jang Sun-woo (born 20 March 1952) is a South Korean film director.

Life
Jang attended Seoul National University and received a bachelor's degree in anthropology.

Before his directorial debut, Jang made a name for himself by writing film criticism and scripts. His first film, Seoul Jesus (1986), based on one of his scripts, was noted for its "sarcasm and pronounced realism." His 1993 film Hwa-Om-Kyung won the Alfred Bauer Prize at the 44th Berlin International Film Festival.

Filmography
 Seoul Jesus (1986)
 The Age of Success (1988)
 The Lovers of Woomook-baemi (1989)
 Road to the Racetracks (1991)
 Hwa-Om-Kyung (1993)
 To You from Me (1994)
 Cinema on the Road (1995)
 A Petal (1996)
 Bad Movie (1997)
 Lies (1999)
 Resurrection of the Little Match Girl (2002)

See also
Cinema of Korea
List of Korean film directors

References

External links

 Detailed information about Jang Sun-woo at the KMDb

Bibliography
 
 

1952 births
Living people
South Korean film directors
Seoul National University alumni